Macrotomoxia kodadai is a species of beetle in the genus Macrotomoxia of the family Mordellidae, which is part of the superfamily Tenebrionoidea. It was discovered in 1922.

References

Beetles described in 1922
Mordellidae